Wang Huiying (born 23 February 1971) is a Chinese gymnast. She competed in six events at the 1988 Summer Olympics.

Eponymous skill
Wang has one eponymous skill listed in the Code of Points.

References

External links
 

1971 births
Living people
Chinese female artistic gymnasts
Olympic gymnasts of China
Gymnasts at the 1988 Summer Olympics
Place of birth missing (living people)
Asian Games medalists in gymnastics
Gymnasts at the 1986 Asian Games
Asian Games gold medalists for China
Medalists at the 1986 Asian Games
Originators of elements in artistic gymnastics